Cameron Independent School District is a public school district based in Cameron, Texas. Founded in 1921 by Charles Yoe. The district covers much of north central Milam County.

In 2010, the school district was rated "academically acceptable" by the Texas Education Agency.

Schools
C.H. Yoe High School (Grades 9-12)
Cameron Junior High School (Grades 6-8)
Cameron Elementary School (Grades 3-5)
Ben Milam Elementary School (Grades PK-2)

Special programs
Temple College Education Center at Cameron is used for dual credit and intro college courses such as College Writing, British Literature, Government, Economics, Psychology, Speech, American History and Biology (as of Fall 2008).

References

External links
Cameron ISD
 Temple College at Cameron

School districts in Milam County, Texas